"In Motion" is a song by Japanese musician hide released as a single on July 10, 2002. Notable for being released four years after his death, it reached number 4 on the Oricon Singles Chart. It was certified gold by the RIAJ in February 2020 for sales over 100,000.

Overview
The demo track for "In Motion" was originally recorded during sessions for hide's second album Psyence, as was "Junk Story". I.N.A. completed it with contributions by other Spread Beaver members and Pata. Both "In Motion" and "Junk Story" were included on the Singles ~ Junk Story compilation a few days after this single.

The single's B-sides are remixes of two songs from Psyence, done by I.N.A, and an instrumental version of "In Motion".

Track listing
All songs written by hide.

Personnel
hide – vocals
I.N.A. – co-producer, programming
Pata – guitar
Kiyoshi – guitar
Chirolyn – bass
D.I.E. – keyboard
Joe – drums
Eric Westfall – mixing engineer, recording engineer
Personnel for "In Motion" only, per the single's liner notes.

Cover versions
The title track was covered by Fest Vainqueur for the Tribute III -Visual Spirits- tribute album, which was released on July 3, 2013. Mini recorded a version for Tribute VI -Female Spirits-, released December 18, 2013.

References

External links

2002 singles
Songs released posthumously
Hide (musician) songs
1996 songs
Songs written by hide (musician)